
This is a list of the 28 players who earned 2020 European Tour cards through Q School in 2019.

 2020 European Tour rookie
 First-time member in 2020 but ineligible for Rookie of the Year award

2020 and 2021 results
Due to the effects of the COVID-19 pandemic on the 2020 European Tour season, all of the graduates retained the same status in 2021 except Højgaard and Välimäki, who were promoted to the winners category after their victories.

In 2021, Q School was cancelled for a second straight year, limiting the normal changes in European Tour membership between seasons. Except for Välimäki, whose win in 2020 gave him an exemption through 2023, all of the 2019 Q School graduates that failed to finish in the top 121 of the Race to Dubai retained conditional status for 2022.

* European Tour rookie in 2020
† First-time member in 2020 but ineligible for Rookie of the Year award
T = Tied
 The player retained full European Tour status for 2022 (finished inside the top 121 in 2021, or won).
 The player retained conditional European Tour status for 2022 (finished outside the top 121 in 2021).

Wins on the European Tour in 2020 and 2021

Runner-up finishes on the European Tour in 2020 and 2021

See also
2019 Challenge Tour graduates
2020 European Tour

References

External links
Official website

European Tour
European Tour Qualifying School Graduates
European Tour Qualifying School Graduates